The 1992 Supercopa Libertadores was the fifth season of the Supercopa Libertadores, a club football tournament for past Copa Libertadores winners. The tournament was won by Cruzeiro, who beat Racing 4–1 on aggregate in the final. This was the second time Cruzeiro had won the Supercopa Libertadores.

As the new reigning Copa Libertadores champions, Brazilian side São Paulo were admitted into the competition.

Colombian side Atlético Nacional took part for the first time in 3 seasons.

First round
The matches were played from 29 September to 15 October.

|}

Quarter finals
The matches were played from 20 October to 30 October. Nacional withdrew before the first leg of their quarter final against Racing due to a players' strike.

|}

Semi-finals
The matches were played from 4 November to 11 November.

|}

Final

|}

See also
1992 Copa Libertadores

External links
RSSSF
RSSSF (Full Details)

Supercopa Libertadores
2